Kufra conflict may refer to:

 Battle of Kufra (1941)
 2008 Kufra conflict
 2012 Kufra conflict